Check It Out is the debut studio album by American soul/R&B group Tavares, released in 1974 on the Capitol label.

Commercial performance
The album peaked at No. 20 on the R&B albums chart. It also reached No. 160 on the Billboard 200. The album features the title track, which peaked at No. 5 on the Hot Soul Singles chart and No. 35 on the Billboard Hot 100, and "That's the Sound That Lonely Makes", which reached No. 10 on the Hot Soul Singles chart and No. 70 on the Billboard Hot 100.

Track listing

Personnel 
Tavares
Antone "Chubby" Tavares - lead vocals on "If That's the Way You Want It", "Strangers in Dark Corners", and "That's the Sound That Lonely Makes"
Feliciano Tavares - lead vocals on "Strangers in Dark Corners", "Little Girl", "Let's Make the Best of What We Got" and "I'm in Love"
Perry "Tiny" Tavares - lead vocals on "That's the Sound That Lonely Makes" and "Wish You Were With Me Mary"
Arthur "Pooch" Tavares - lead vocals on "I'll Never Say Never Again"
Ralph Vierra Tavares - lead vocals on "Mama's Little Girl"
with:
 Victor Tavares - lead vocals on “Check It Out”
James Gadson – drums
James Jamerson, Jr. – bass
Weldon Dean Parks, Melvin "Wah Wah" Ragin, David T. Walker – guitar
Joseph Sample – piano
Mike Melvoin – keyboards
Gene Estes – percussion
Bobbye Hall – conga
H. B. Barnum - arrangements, conductor
Technical
Bob "Boogie" Bowles - producer, arrangements and conductor on "Check It Out" and "I'm in Love"
Greg Venable - sound engineer
Larkin Arnold - executive supervision
Brian Panella - album coordination
John Hoernle - art direction
Richard Rankin - photography

Charts
Album

Singles

References

External links

1974 debut albums
Tavares (group) albums
albums arranged by H. B. Barnum
Albums produced by Johnny Bristol
Capitol Records albums